Lars Warming (born 21 June 1963) is a Danish athlete. He competed in the men's decathlon at the 1988 Summer Olympics. His best result in Decathlon is 7994 points which is also current Danish national record.

References

1963 births
Living people
Athletes (track and field) at the 1988 Summer Olympics
Danish decathletes
Olympic athletes of Denmark
Sportspeople from Aarhus